Jilee Dhummuugaa (also known as Jile Timuga  is a district located in the Oromia Zone of the Amhara region of Ethiopia. Jilee Dhummuugaa is bordered on the east and south by the Afar Region, on the west by the North shewa Zone, and on the north by Artuma Fursi. Towns in Jilee Dhummuugaa include Senbete. Jilee Dhummuugaa was part of the former Artuma Fursi Jilee woreda.

Demographics
Based on the 2007 national census conducted by the Central Statistical Agency of Ethiopia (CSA), this woreda has a total population of 72,882, of whom 35,700 are men and 37,182 women; 5,075, 6.96% are urban inhabitants. The majority of the inhabitants were Muslim, with 98.83% reporting that as their religion.

Notes

Districts of Amhara Region